Stuart Spencer may refer to:
Stuart Spencer (footballer) (1932–2011), Australian rules footballer
Stuart Spencer (political consultant) (born 1927), American political consultant